The House at 230 Melrose Street in the Auburndale section of Newton, Massachusetts, is one of the village's most elaborately decorated houses.  The two story wood-frame house was built c. 1858, and features predominantly Second Empire styling, including a distinctive tower above the entry that is capped by an extended bracketed cornice.  The porch features Stick style valance decoration, a feature not usually seen until later in the 19th century.

The house was listed on the National Register of Historic Places in 1986.

See also
 National Register of Historic Places listings in Newton, Massachusetts

References

Houses on the National Register of Historic Places in Newton, Massachusetts
Second Empire architecture in Massachusetts
Houses completed in 1858